This is a list of the French SNEP Top 100 Singles and Top 150 albums number-ones of 2003.

Number ones by week

Singles chart

Albums chart

Top ten best sales
This is the ten best-selling singles and albums in 2003.

Singles

Albums

See also
2003 in music
List of artists who reached number one on the French Singles Chart

References

2003 in French music
France singles
2003